4-Acetyloxy-N,N-dipropyltryptamine (or 4-AcO-DPT) is a tryptamine derivative. 4-AcO-DPT has been sold as a designer drug. It is an ester of 4-HO-DPT, a psychedelic tryptamine first synthesized by Alexander Shulgin. Anecdotal reports indicate that 4-AcO-DPT exerts psychoactive effects in humans, however, the pharmacology of 4-AcO-DPT has not been examined.

See also
 4-AcO-DMT
 4-HO-DPT
 Dipropyltryptamine

References

Tryptamines
Designer drugs
Acetate esters